Quay County is a county in the state of New Mexico. As of the 2010 census, the population was 9,041. Its county seat is Tucumcari. The county was named for Pennsylvania senator Matthew Quay, who supported statehood for New Mexico. Its eastern border is the Texas state line, approximately 103.04 degrees west longitude.

Geography

Adjacent counties

 Union County - north
 Harding County - northwest
 San Miguel County - west
 Guadalupe County - west
 De Baca County - southwest
 Roosevelt County - south
 Curry County - south
 Deaf Smith County, Texas - southeast
 Oldham County, Texas - east
 Hartley County, Texas - northeast

Demographics

2000 census
As of the 2000 census, there were 10,155 people, 4,201 households, and 2,844 families living in the county. The population density was 4 people per square mile (1/km2). There were 5,664 housing units at an average density of 2 per square mile (1/km2). The racial makeup of the county was 82.09% White, 0.84% Black or African American, 1.27% Native American, 0.80% Asian, 0.15% Pacific Islander, 12.11% from other races, and 2.75% from two or more races. 37.98% of the population were Hispanic or Latino of any race.

There were 4,201 households, out of which 28.90% had children under the age of 18 living with them, 52.10% were married couples living together, 12.00% had a female householder with no husband present, and 32.30% were non-families. 28.90% of all households were made up of individuals, and 13.80% had someone living alone who was 65 years of age or older. The average household size was 2.37 and the average family size was 2.90.

In the county, the population was spread out, with 25.00% under the age of 18, 6.70% from 18 to 24, 23.30% from 25 to 44, 26.00% from 45 to 64, and 19.00% who were 65 years of age or older. The median age was 42 years. For every 100 females, there were 94.00 males. For every 100 females age 18 and over, there were 91.50 males.

The median income for a household in the county was $24,894, and the median income for a family was $30,362. Males had a median income of $24,801 versus $17,500 for females. The per capita income for the county was $14,938. About 15.70% of families and 20.90% of the population were below the poverty line, including 25.50% of those under age 18 and 15.80% of those age 65 or over.

2010 census
As of the 2010 census, there were 9,041 people, 4,072 households, and 2,502 families living in the county. The racial makeup of the county was 86.1% white, 1.2% American Indian, 1.1% black or African American, 1.0% Asian, 7.2% from other races, and 3.4% from two or more races. Those of Hispanic or Latino origin made up 42.4% of the population. In terms of ancestry, 11.4% were American, 10.7% were English, 10.5% were German, and 9.8% were Irish.

Of the 4,072 households, 26.4% had children under the age of 18 living with them, 43.5% were married couples living together, 12.7% had a female householder with no husband present, 38.6% were non-families, and 34.2% of all households were made up of individuals. The average household size was 2.21 and the average family size was 2.79. The median age was 45.6 years.

The median income for a household in the county was $28,773 and the median income for a family was $41,766. Males had a median income of $29,769 versus $32,462 for females. The per capita income for the county was $18,234. About 13.3% of families and 21.1% of the population were below the poverty line, including 30.7% of those under age 18 and 17.3% of those age 65 or over.

Communities

City
 Tucumcari (county seat)

Villages
 House
 Logan
 San Jon

Census-designated place
 Nara Visa

Other communities
 Bard
 Endee
 Forrest
 Glenrio (partly in Deaf Smith County, Texas)
 McAlister
 Montoya
 Quay
 Wheatland

Politics

Education
School districts include:
 Grady Municipal Schools
 House Municipal Schools
 Logan Municipal Schools
 Melrose Public Schools
 San Jon Municipal Schools
 Tucumcari Public Schools

See also
 National Register of Historic Places listings in Quay County, New Mexico

References

 
1903 establishments in New Mexico Territory